The 2004 Eastern Michigan Eagles football team represented Eastern Michigan University in the 2004 NCAA Division I-A football season. In their first season under head coach Jeff Genyk, the Eagles compiled a 4–7 record, finished in fourth place in the West Division of the Mid-American Conference, and were outscored by their opponents 458 to 328. The team's statistical leaders included Matt Bohnet with 2,807 passing yards, Anthony Sherrell with 854 rushing yards, and Eric Deslauriers with 1,252 receiving yards. Eric Deslauriers received the team's most valuable player award.

Schedule

References

Eastern Michigan
Eastern Michigan Eagles football seasons
Eastern Michigan Eagles football